The United Grand Lodges of Germany (German: Vereinigte Großlogen von Deutschland or VGLvD) is an association (confederation) of the five Grand Lodges of Freemasons in Germany which are recognized as regular by the United Grand Lodge of England, and represents them all at an international level.

The Masons of the VGLvD are committed to dignity, freedom and self-determination of people-centered traditions of their league.  The organization claims to have approximately 470 lodges, all male, for a total of about 14,100 Masons (there is a separate Women's Grand Lodge of Germany and the two grand lodges recognize the existence of each other, though they have no official ties).

Grand Lodges 

The United Grand Lodges of Germany comprise five constituent lodges:

 Grand Lodge of Ancient Free and Accepted Masons of Germany (Großloge der Alten Freien und Angenommenen Maurer von Deutschland, GL AFuAMvD)
 Grand Landlodge of the Freemasons of Germany (Große Landesloge der Freimaurer von Deutschland, GLL FvD)
 Grand National Mother Lodge, "The Three Globes" (Große National-Mutterloge „Zu den drei Weltkugeln“), (GNML 3WK)
 Grand Lodge of British Freemasons in Germany (GL BFG)
 American Canadian Grand Lodge A.F. & A.M (ACGL)

Additionally, the United Grand Lodges of Germany adopted the two St. John's lodges with special responsibilities for Jacob de Molay of the Flaming Star  the travelling lodge The White Lily  and the research lodge Quatuor Coronati.

Constitution 

On 27 April 1958, the former United Grand Lodge of Germany (now the Grand Lodge of Ancient Free and Accepted Masons of Germany (GL AFuAMvD), founded on 19 June 1949 in St. Paul's Church in Frankfurt) and the Grand Landlodge of the Freemasons of Germany (German: Große Landesloge der Freimaurer von Deutschland (GLL FvD), formed in 1770) joined together in the Vereinigten Großlogen von Deutschland, Bruderschaft der Freimaurer (United Grand Lodges of Germany, Brotherhood of Freemasons) with a Magna Carta of German Freemasons.  In 1970, the Grand National Mother Lodge, "The Three Globes" (German: Große National-Mutterloge „Zu den drei Weltkugeln“ (GNML 3WK), formed in 1740), the German District Grand Lodge of the United Grand Lodge of England (now the Grand Lodge of British Freemasons in Germany) and the American Canadian Provincial Grand Lodge (ACPGL AF & AM) also joined the United Grand Lodges of Germany under this Magna Carta.

The VGLvD represents German Freemasonry to foreign institutions (the other Grand Lodges) and the German public.  The member Grand Lodges are autonomous in their internal affairs and in the manner of teaching.

Unlike other grand lodges of the Grand Master of VGLvD acts only as a representative.  The decision-making body is the Senate which consists of five members of the GL AFuAMvD, three members of the GLLFvD and one member of each of the other three Grand Lodges.

Grandmasters 
 Theodor Vogel (1958–1959),
 Friedrich August Pinkerneil (1959–1960 and 1962–1963),
 Konrad Merkel (1960–1961),
 Richard Müller-Börner (1961–1962),
 Willi Schulz (1963–1965 and 1969–1970),
 Werner Römer, (1965–1966 and 1968–1969),
 Heinz Rüggeberg (1966–1968),
 Hans Gemünd (1970–1971),
 Hermann Kehlenbeck (1971–1972),
 Friedrich Heller (1972–1975),
 Walter Veit (1975–1976),
 Hans Werner Schneider (1976),
 Günther Gall (1976–1977),
 Bernhard Rohland (1977–1978),
 Jürgen Holtorf (1978–1985),
 Ernst Walter (1985–1991),
 Rainer J. Schicke (1991–1997),
 Alfred F. Koska (1997–2003),
 Klaus Horneffer (2003–2006),
 Klaus-M. Kott (2006–2009),
 Prof. Dr. Rüdiger Templin (2010-2015),
 Christoph Bosbach (2015-2021),
 TBD (2021-present).

References 
 Joachim Berger, Klaus-Jürgen Grün (Hrsg.): Geheime Gesellschaft: Weimar und die deutsche Freimaurerei. Katalog zur Ausstellung der Stiftung Weimarer Klassik im Schiller-Museum Weimar 21. Juni bis 31. Dezember 2002, Hanser Verlag, München 2002, 
 Klaus Jürgen Grün: Philosophie der Freimaurerei. Eine interkulturelle Perspektive. Interkulturelle Bibliothek 124, Traugott Bautz Verlag, Nordhausen 2006, 
 Helmut Reinalter: Die Freimaurer. 4. Auflage. Beck Verlag, München 2004, 
 Tom Goeller: Freimaurer. Aufklärung eines Mythos. Berlin 2006. 
 Michael Kraus (Hrsg): Die Freimaurer. Salzburg 2007. 
 Jahrbuch 2008 der Vereinigten Großlogen von Deutschland - Bruderschaft der Freimaurer

Further reading
 Hoffmann, Stefan-Ludwig. Freemasonry and German Civil Society, 1840-1918 (U of Michigan Press, 2007). excerpt; see also online review

External links 
United Grand Lodges of Germany

 
Grand Lodges
Freemasonry in Germany
1958 establishments in Germany
Organizations established in 1958